Chemical WorkBench is a proprietary simulation software tool aimed at the reactor scale kinetic modeling of homogeneous gas-phase and heterogeneous processes and kinetic mechanism development. It can be effectively used for the modeling, optimization, and design of a wide range of industrially and environmentally important chemistry-loaded processes. Chemical WorkBench is a modeling environment based on advanced scientific approaches, complementary databases, and accurate solution methods. Chemical WorkBench is developed and distributed by Kintech Lab.

Chemical WorkBench models
Chemical WorkBench has an extensive library of physicochemical models:
Thermodynamic Models
Gas-Phase Kinetic Models
Flame model
Heterogeneous Kinetic Models
Non-Equilibrium Plasma Models
Detonation and Aerodynamic Models
Membrane Separation Models
Mechanism Analysis and Reduction

Fields of application
Chemical WorkBench can be used by researchers and engineers working in the following fields:
General chemical kinetics and thermodynamics
Kinetic mechanisms development
Thin films growth for microelectronics
Nanotechnology 
Catalysis and chemical engineering 
Combustion, detonation and pollution control 
Waste treatment and recovering 
Plasma light sources and plasma chemistry 
High-temperature chemistry 
Education
Combustion and detonation, clean power-generation technologies, safety analysis, CVD, heterogeneous and catalytic reactions and processes, and processes in non-equilibrium plasmas are the main areas of interest.

External links
Chemical WorkBench web page
Video Review of Chemical Workbench-Tool for Modeling Reactive Flows and Developing Chemical Mechanisms

See also 
 Chemical kinetics
 Autochem
 Cantera
 CHEMKIN
 Kinetic PreProcessor (KPP)

References
1. https://web.archive.org/web/20090108090305/http://www.softscout.com/software/Science-and-Laboratory/Scientific-Modeling-and-Simulation/Chemical-Workbench.html 
2. 

3. 

Chemical engineering software
Chemical kinetics
Combustion
Computational chemistry software
Molecular modelling software